Narayan Dutta Ojha (born 19 January 1926, date of death unknown) was an Indian judge and politician. He served as the Chief Justice of the Madhya Pradesh High Court in January 1987. He was the acting Governor of Madhya Pradesh in December 1987. He was earlier the Acting Chief Justice of the Allahabad High Court from August to September 1986. Later he became a judge of the Supreme Court of India in January 1988 and retired in January  1991. Ojha is deceased.

See also
 List of Governors of Madhya Pradesh

References 

1926 births
Year of death missing
20th-century Indian judges
Chief Justices of the Madhya Pradesh High Court
Governors of Madhya Pradesh
Judges of the Allahabad High Court
Justices of the Supreme Court of India